Omophron solidum, the solid round sand beetle, is a species of ground beetle in the family Carabidae. It is found in North America.

References

Further reading

 
 
 
 
 
 

Carabidae
Beetles described in 1897